Dale Reese Sprankle (August 4, 1898 – November 11, 1963) was a sports coach and athletic director at both Adrian College and Albion College in Michigan. Over the course of his 35-year career, Sprankle won 23 Michigan Intercollegiate Athletic Association (MIAA) conference championships in four sports, making him one of the winningest coaches in that conference's history.

Early life
Sprankle was born on August 4, 1898 in Beach City, Ohio. He was the younger brother of LeRoy Sprankle, who would also become an athletics icon, most notably in Eastern Tennessee and South Florida. At the age of 12, his family moved to Canton, Ohio, where he participated in athletics and attended high school. Upon graduation, Sprankle completed his education at the nearby Mount Union College.

Coaching career
In 1923, Sprankle was hired as the director of physical education (athletic director) at Adrian College in Adrian, Michigan. From 1923 to 1936, he was the head coach of basketball, cross country, football, and track and field at the college, compiling a 55–51–8 record in football and a .516 winning percentage in basketball. In 1936, he left to become the assistant athletic director and head coach of cross country, football, and indoor and outdoor track at Albion College. Five years later, Sprankle was promoted to athletic director, the position from which he served at the college until his retirement in 1958. Over the course of the 22 years he coached at Albion, his teams won 23 Michigan Intercollegiate Athletic Association (MIAA) championships which is currently tied for seventh all-time in that conference. In the nine seasons that he coached football, between 1936 and 1946, the team went 36–33–4 and won two MIAA championships. In indoor track, Sprankle coached the team for five years and won MIAA championships in each. His outdoor track team also had great success, winning six MIAA championships over the course of eight years. Sprankle's greatest success, however, came with the cross country team, which won 10 MIAA championships in his 12 years of coaching, from 1947 to 1958. In 1958, due to declining health, he retired from his position, but still kept up a close relationship with the school. Sprankle died on November 11, 1963, at the age of 65, following a four-year illness. In 1976, the football stadium at Albion College was renamed Sprankle-Sprandel Stadium in honor of the school's two greatest sports coaches. Thirteen years later, in 1989, Sprankle was inducted into the Albion College Sports Hall of Fame.

Notable players coached

Head coaching record

Football

References

External links
 

1898 births
1963 deaths
American men's basketball players
Adrian Bulldogs athletic directors
Adrian Bulldogs baseball coaches
Adrian Bulldogs football coaches
Adrian Bulldogs men's basketball coaches
Albion Britons athletic directors
Albion Britons football coaches
Mount Union Purple Raiders baseball players
Mount Union Purple Raiders football players
Mount Union Purple Raiders men's basketball players
College men's basketball head coaches in the United States
College track and field coaches in the United States
People from Beach City, Ohio